Dypsis ampasindavae is a species of palm tree. It is endemic to Madagascar. It is native to the Sambirano region of northwestern Madagascar, where it is found in subhumid lowland forest from sea level to 300 meters elevation. It is known from only two locations, and there are fewer than 30 mature individuals between them.

References

ampasindavae
Endemic flora of Madagascar
Flora of the Madagascar subhumid forests
Taxonomy articles created by Polbot